The Accipitrinae are the subfamily of the Accipitridae often known as the "true" hawks, including all members of Accipiter and the closely related genera Microspizias,  Erythrotriorchis, and Megatriorchis. The large and widespread genus Accipiter includes goshawks, sparrowhawks, the sharp-shinned hawk and others. They are primarily woodland birds that hunt by sudden dashes from a concealed perch, with long tails, broad wings and high visual acuity facilitating this lifestyle. In light of recent genetic research, the kites of the traditional subfamily Milvinae may also belong to this group.

Hawks, including the accipitrines, are believed to have vision several times sharper than humans, in part because of the great number of photoreceptor cells in their retinas (up to 1,000,000 per square mm, against 200,000 for humans), a very high number of nerves connecting the receptors to the brain, and an indented fovea, which magnifies the central portion of the visual field.

Species in taxonomic order 

 Subfamily Accipitrinae
 Genus Accipiter 
 African goshawk, A. tachiro
 Besra, A. virgatus
 Bicolored hawk, A. bicolor
 Black sparrowhawk, A. melanoleucus
 Brown goshawk, A. fasciatus
 Chestnut-flanked sparrowhawk, A. castanilius
 Chinese sparrowhawk, A. soloensis
 Christmas goshawk, Accipiter fasciatus natalis
 Collared sparrowhawk, A. cirrocephalus
 Cooper's hawk, A. cooperii
 Crested goshawk, A. trivirgatus
 Dwarf sparrowhawk, A. nanus
 Eurasian sparrowhawk, A. nisus
 Fiji goshawk, A. rufitorques
 Frances's sparrowhawk, A. francesii
 Grey goshawk, A. novaehollandiae
 Grey-bellied hawk, A. poliogaster
 Grey-headed goshawk, A. poliocephalus
 Gundlach's hawk, A. gundlachi
 Henst's goshawk, A. henstii
 Imitator sparrowhawk, A. imitator
 Japanese sparrowhawk, A. gularis
 Levant sparrowhawk, A. brevipes
 Little sparrowhawk, A. minullus
 Madagascar sparrowhawk, A. madagascariensis
 Moluccan goshawk, A. henicogrammus
 Meyer's goshawk, A. meyerianus
 New Britain goshawk, A. princeps
 New Britain sparrowhawk, A. brachyurus
 Nicobar sparrowhawk, A. butleri
 Northern goshawk, A. gentilis
 Ovambo sparrowhawk, A. ovampensis
 Pied goshawk, A. albogularis
 Plain-breasted hawk, A. ventralis
 Red-chested goshawk, A. toussenelii
 Red-thighed sparrowhawk, A. erythropus
 Rufous-chested sparrowhawk, A. rufiventris
 Rufous-necked sparrowhawk, A. erythrauchen
 Rufous-thighed hawk, A. erythronemius
 Sharp-shinned hawk, A. striatus
 Shikra, A. badius
 Slaty-mantled sparrowhawk, A. luteoschistaceus
 Spot-tailed sparrowhawk, A. trinotatus
 Sulawesi goshawk, A. griseiceps
 Vinous-breasted sparrowhawk, A. rhodogaster
 White-bellied goshawk, A. haplochrous
 Genus Erythrotriorchis 
 Chestnut-shouldered goshawk, E. buergersi
 Red goshawk, E. radiatus
 Genus Megatriorchis 
 Doria's goshawk, M. doriae
 Genus Microspizias 
 Tiny hawk, M. superciliosus
 Semicollared hawk, M. collaris
Several genera or species formerly classified in this subfamily, such as Micronisus, Urotriorchis, Microspizias, and Lophospiza, have since been moved out of Accipitrinae following phylogenetic studies. In contrast, other genera such as Circus have since been reclassified into Accipitrinae.

Hawks and humans 
Hawks are sometimes used in falconry, a sport in which trained birds of prey are flown at small game for sport.

References

External links 
Hawk videos on the Internet Bird Collection
Hawk photos taken on the central coast of California.

 
 
Bird subfamilies
Birds of prey
Accipitridae